The Boys is the eponymous second album from American R&B group Suns of Light (originally known as the Boys), released in  via Motown Records. Although L.A. Reid and Babyface produced the bulk of their debut album Messages from the Boys, instead one song is produced by Daryl Simmons and Kayo, who were a part of the LaFace production and songwriting camp.

Three singles were released from the album: "Crazy", "Thing Called Love" and "Thanx 4 the Funk". "Crazy" is the last song the group has released to date to reach #1 on the Billboard R&B chart, as well as the last song to date to chart on the Billboard Hot 100, peaking at #29.

The album peaked at #108 on the Billboard 200. In addition to original songs, it contains a cover of the Michael Jackson song "Got to Be There".

Track listing

Chart positions

References

External links
 

1990 albums
The Boys (American band) albums
Motown albums